Belida River may refer to a number of rivers in Sumatra, Indonesia and in Malaysia.
It is known locally as Sungai Belida ("sungai" in Indonesian or Malaysian language means "river").

Indonesia
 Sungai Belida, Riau: a tributary of Indragiri River, province of Riau, and is nearby to Transmigration Block C 0 Unit I Lumu, Tanjungputat and Transmigration Block B Unit I Lumu , elevation: 11 m (36 feet).
 Sungai Belida, North Sumatra: an irrigation ditch within North Sumatra province and is nearby to Kebon Kelapa, Kampung Pinang and Sungaiular, elevation: 6 m (20 feet).
 Sungai Belida, South Sumatra: a tributary of Musi River, South Sumatra, passing the city of Prabumulih.

Malaysia
 Sungai Belida, Kelantan (lat 5,87, long 102,42), 
 Sungai Belida, Kedah, 
 Sungai Belida, Pahang (lat 4,29, long 101,76), 
 Sungai Belida, Pahang (lat 4,19, long 102,08), 
 Sungai Belida, Sarawak, 
 Sungai Belida, Kelantan (lat 4,88, long 102,48),

Reference